The New Middle Party (in Dutch: Nieuwe Midden Partij, NMP) is a Dutch small business-interest political party. The NMP is a marginal party and was only successful during the 1971 elections.

History
The NMP was founded in 1970. It entered in the 1971 elections, and won two seats. Several months after the elections one of its MPs, De Jong, came into conflict with the party's chair, Te Pas, because he was involved in lawsuits over corruption. De Jong continued as independent MP. In the 1972 election the party won no seats.

The party continues to exist and unsuccessfully competed in the 2002 election.

Name
The party saw itself as the continuation of the pre-war Middle Class Party, as such it styled itself as "New Middle Class Party" or "New Middle Party".

Ideology & Issues
The NMP is a party for businesspeople and shopkeepers. It also appeals to forgotten groups like the elderly, unmarried and disabled. It wants to spread taxes and benefits more equally between social groups. It is fiscally conservative and seeks to reduce bureaucracy and government debt. Meanwhile, it wants to protect the value of old age pensions and increase spending on healthcare. Furthermore, it wants to end "car bullying", that is taxes on petrol, driven kilometers and car-purchases. It advocates limited migration into the EU and cutting spending on development cooperation.

Representation
This table show the NMP's results in elections to the House of Representatives and Senate, as well as the party's political leadership: the fractievoorzitter, is the chair of the parliamentary party and the lijsttrekker is the party's top candidate in the general election, these posts are normally taken by the party's leader.

Electorate
The NMP was supported in the 1971 elections by floating voters, especially those who supported a similar party, the Farmers' Party during the 1967 elections.

International Comparison
As a protest party of the middle class the NMP is comparable to the Norwegian or Danish progress parties, they were however far more successful.

Liberal parties in the Netherlands
Political parties established in 1970
Defunct political parties in the Netherlands